Sibogasyrinx archibenthalis is a species of sea snail, a marine gastropod mollusc in the family Cochlespiridae.

Description

Distribution
This marine species occurs off the Philippines at a depth of 924 m.

References

 Powell (1969), Indo-Pacific Mollusca. 2(10): 334, pl. 264, fig. 6,7.

External links
 Kantor Yu.I., Fedosov A.E. & Puillandre N. (2018). New and unusual deep-water Conoidea revised with shell, radula and DNA characters. Ruthenica. 28(2): 47–82

archibenthalis
Gastropods described in 1969